William Cleland Sneddon (1 April 1914 – April 1995) was a Scottish professional footballer and manager who played as a wing half in the Football League for Brentford, Newport County and Swansea Town. He began his senior career in Scotland with Falkirk.

Career

Early years 
A wing half, Sneddon began his career in junior football with Wishaw Juniors and Rutherglen Glencairn. He began his senior career with Scottish League Second Division club Falkirk in December 1935 and made 44 appearances and scored eight goals before departing in June 1937.

Brentford 
Sneddon moved to England to join First Division club Brentford for a £4,000 fee in June 1937, as a replacement for Welsh international Dai Richards. He quickly established himself in the side and made 44 appearances during the 1937–38 season. Sneddon found game-time harder to come by during the 1938–39 season and made 27 appearances, scoring two goals. He left Griffin Park at the end of the campaign, having made 70 appearances and scored two goals in his two seasons with the Bees.

Swansea Town 
Sneddon and Brentford teammate Sam Briddon moved to Wales to sign for Second Division club Swansea Town in July 1939 for a then-club record £2,000 fee. The outbreak of the Second World War two months later put Sneddon's professional career on hold, though he continued to represent the Swans during the war. After the cessation of hostilities in 1945, Sneddon made two competitive appearances before leaving in November 1946.

Wartime guest appearances 
Sneddon played as a guest for Scottish clubs Ayr United and Hamilton Academical as a guest during the Second World War. His most memorable spell came with a return to Brentford, who he helped to win the 1941–42 London War Cup. He returned again during the 1942–43 season.

Newport County 
Sneddon joined Second Division club Newport County in November 1946 and he made 18 league appearances during the 1946–47 season before departing at the end of the campaign.

Milford United 
Sneddon ended his career with a player-manager spell at Welsh League club Milford United.

International career 
Sneddon made an appearance for Scotland in a trial game while a Falkirk player, but failed to be called up to a senior squad.

Managerial career

Milford United 
While with Welsh League club Milford United, Sneddon combined his playing duties with that of the club's manager.

Burton Albion 
Sneddon had a spell as manager of Birmingham and District League club Burton Albion between 1952 and 1953.

Career statistics

Honours 
Falkirk

 Falkirk Infirmary Shield: 1935–36, 1936–37

Brentford
 London War Cup: 1941–42

References

1914 births
1995 deaths
Sportspeople from Wishaw
Scottish footballers
English Football League players
Association football wing halves
Brentford F.C. players
Wishaw Juniors F.C. players
Hamilton Academical F.C. wartime guest players
Rutherglen Glencairn F.C. players
Falkirk F.C. players
Swansea City A.F.C. players
Ayr United F.C. wartime guest players
Brentford F.C. wartime guest players
Newport County A.F.C. players
Scottish football managers
Scottish Football League players
Burton Albion F.C. managers
Milford United F.C. players
Milford United F.C. managers